The town of Rogersville, Tennessee is governed by a Board of Mayor and Aldermen, authorized under a charter first enacted by the General Assembly of Tennessee in 1836.

North Carolina Charter, 1786–1836
When Rogersville was first founded, it was as the county seat of Hawkins County, and thus it was called simply Hawkins Court House. The North Carolina General Assembly appointed a Board of Commissioners and Trustees to oversee the town. The legislature appointed the first members of the board. Upon the death, resignation, or removal from the county or state, the board would nominate its own successors.

The first members of the board were:
 Thomas King
 Thomas Hutchins
 Joseph McCulloch
 Thomas Jackson
 Elijah Chissom

Tennessee incorporation, 1836–present

48 years after the town was chartered by the State of North Carolina, the State of Tennessee reincorporated the town in 1835. Following the incorporation, Rogersville was granted an elected Board of Mayor and Aldermen. From 1835 to 1883, the officers served two-year terms. When the town was reincorporated by the General Assembly in 1883 to add new property to the corporate limits, the term of office was changed to four years.

Today, mayors of Rogersville serve four-year terms and are eligible to re-election without term limits.

Rogersville's current mayor, Jim Sells, has been re-elected every four years since 1977.

List of mayors

Following is a list of the mayors of Rogersville:

References

Rogersville
People from Rogersville, Tennessee